German submarine U-501 was a Type IXC U-boat of Nazi Germany's Kriegsmarine during World War II. The submarine was laid down on 12 February 1940 at the Deutsche Werft yard in Hamburg, launched on 25 January 1941 and commissioned on 30 April 1941 under the command of Korvettenkapitän Hugo Förster. The boat served with 2nd U-boat Flotilla until she was sunk on 10 September 1941.

Design
German Type IXC submarines were slightly larger than the original Type IXBs. U-501 had a displacement of  when at the surface and  while submerged. She had two shafts and two  propellers.

U-501 was fitted with six  torpedo tubes (four fitted at the bow and two at the stern), 22 torpedoes, one  SK C/32 naval gun, 180 rounds, and a  SK C/30 as well as a  C/30 anti-aircraft gun. The boat had a complement of forty-eight.

Service history

U-501 departed from Kiel on 2 July 1941 and sailed to Trondheim in Norway via Horten Naval Base also in Norway, by 15 July. From there she sailed on her first and only war patrol on 7 August 1941, heading out into the waters around Iceland. The ship's distress signals were received and an aircraft sent to search for her, but it found nothing and reported that there were probably no survivors. In fact all 23 crew members were in two lifeboats heading for Iceland, which they reached on 12 and 13 September.

Sinking
Five days later, on the night of 10 September, U-501 was taking part in a mass attack on Allied Convoy SC 42 in the Denmark Strait south of Tasiilaq, Greenland, in position , when she was detected by the Canadian   with sonar, and damaged with depth charges. U-501s captain, Hugo Förster, decided to scuttle the U-boat. On the surface, she was spotted by the corvette , which attempted to ram her. However, U-501 turned at the last moment so that the two vessels were running parallel, only feet apart. For unknown reasons, Hugo Förster surrendered himself and abandoned his command by leaping from the submarine's bridge to the deck of the Moose Jaw.

The Moose Jaw veered away and the U-boat's first watch officer took command; he continued with the scuttling. A nine-man party from the Chambly got on board the U-501 in an attempt to seize secret papers, but the submarine sank under their feet. One Canadian sailor and eleven Germans died. The remaining thirty-five crewmen were taken prisoner. Förster was repatriated to Germany in 1945 during a prisoner exchange. He later committed suicide, criticisms from fellow U-Boat commanders noted as a contributing factor.

This was the first U-boat kill by the Royal Canadian Navy during the Battle of the Atlantic.

Wolfpacks
U-501 took part in two wolfpacks, namely:
 Grönland (10 – 27 August 1941) 
 Markgraf (27 August – 10 September 1941)

Summary of raiding history

References

Bibliography

 Blair, Clay, Hitler's U-Boat War: The Hunters 1939-41 (1999), Weidenfeld & Nicolson, New York.

External links

German Type IX submarines
U-boats commissioned in 1941
World War II submarines of Germany
Shipwrecks in the Greenland Sea
World War II shipwrecks in the Atlantic Ocean
U-boats sunk by Canadian warships
1941 ships
Ships built in Hamburg
U-boats scuttled in 1941
Maritime incidents in September 1941